Badekkila Pradeep is an Indian Television personality, best known for his Voice Overs in South India, especially the Kannada Television Industry. An actor, model, writer, lyricist and a podcaster, his Voice has been reaching millions every day since 2006.

He is popularly known as the voice we hear on Bigg Boss Kannada. He has been the voice of Colors Kannada, TV9 Kannada, Namma Metro and hundreds of commercials, documentaries and so on.

Early life 
Born in a village near Puttur, Badekkila Pradeep belongs to a family of agriculturists. Badekkila is the place where he was born and brought up, while his early schooling happened in his village, he studied in various institutions in Mangalore, Mumbai before he began his career in media.

Career

As voice artist 
Badekkila Pradeep has been the voice of various Kannada Television channels for more than 16 years now. He was first the voice of Star Suvarna, Zee Kannada and finally moved to Etv Kannada which is now Colors Kannada.

He is known for his unique style and modulations and created a niche of his own in the Kannada Voice over industry. Badekkila Pradeep has given the voice for various popular Kannada TV shows like Pyate Hudgeer halli Lifeu, Halli Haida Pyateg Banda, Pyate Mandi Kadig Bandru, Indian, Super Minute, Kannadada Kotyadhipati and most remarkably, the narrator voice on Bigg Boss Kannada ever since the beginning of the series.

Badekkila Pradeep is also the English voice in Namma Metro, Bangalore. He has done thousands of voice overs in multiple languages like Kannada, English, Telugu, Hindi, Tamil and Tulu. Apart from Colors Kannada, his voice is heard on TV channels like TV9, Discovery (Kannada), National Geographic (Kannada)

Actor and Model 
Badekkila Pradeep has acted in Kannada and Tamil serials. He has also acted as a hero in a Kannada movie, Mirchi Mandakki Kadak Chai. He has been the face of multiple national TVCs for Colgate, Bru, Honda, Redbus, GRT and other brands.

His role as Prem in Tamil serial Sondha Bandham on Sun TV gained him much popularity in Tamil Television industry.

Podcaster 
Relax and Recharge on www.uvlisten.com are the two podcast shows Badekkila Pradeep has been hosting since October, 2021. Both the shows have been gaining momentum ever since the launch, which are conceptualised and presented by Pradeep.

Filmography

Television

Film

References

External links 
 Badekkila Pradeep on Twitter
 Badekkila Pradeep on Facebook
 Badekkila Pradeep

Living people
Kannada people
Tamil male television actors
Television personalities from Tamil Nadu
Male actors from Bangalore
Indian male models
Indian male film actors
Indian radio presenters
Indian male television journalists
21st-century Tamil male actors
Journalists from Karnataka
People from Dakshina Kannada district
Indian male television actors
Male actors in Kannada television
Male actors in Kannada cinema
21st-century Indian male actors
Year of birth missing (living people)